Robert Schuler (June 15, 1943 – June 19, 2009) was a Republican politician who formerly served in the Ohio General Assembly.  Schuler first entered politics in the late 1970s as a member of the Deer Park City Council and also spent four years as a Sycamore Township trustee from 1988 to 1992.  Initially running for the Ohio House of Representatives in 1992, he went on to win reelection in 1994, 1996, and 1998.  With term limits in effect, Schuler was ineligible to run for a fifth term in 2000, and was succeeded by Michelle G. Schneider.

Although term-limited from the House, Schuler soon returned to the legislature as a member of the Ohio Senate.  With Richard Finan term-limited in 2002, Schuler sought his seat. He went on to win, and was reelected in 2006.

In his memoir Hillbilly Elegy, J. D. Vance recalls that he worked for Schuler while he was in college.

Suffering from cancer while in the Senate, Schuler died in June 2009, with a year and a half left in his term. Shannon Jones was appointed by senate Republicans to fill out the remainder of his term.<ref>S. R. No. 93-Senator Niehaus: Relative to the appointment of Shannon Jones to fill the vacancy in the membership of the Senate for the 7th Senatorial District, Ohio Senate Journal (August 11, 2019).</ref>

References

External links
Senator Robert Schuler at Project Vote SmartFollow the Money'' - Robert L. Schuler
2006 2004 2002 2000 1998 1996 campaign contributions

1943 births
2009 deaths
Deaths from cancer in Ohio
Republican Party members of the Ohio House of Representatives
Republican Party Ohio state senators
Politicians from Cincinnati
People from Deer Park, Ohio
20th-century American politicians
21st-century American politicians